John Baptista Ashe (1810December 29, 1857), was an American slave owner, lawyer and the nephew of the Revolutionary War veteran John Baptista Ashe, who served as a U.S. Congressman for Tennessee for one term (1843–1845).

Biography
Ashe was born in Rocky Point, Pender County, North Carolina, in 1810. He attended Fayetteville Academy and was in the 1830 class of Trinity College (then called Washington College), Hartford, Connecticut, but for unknown reasons did not receive his diploma until 1844. He studied law and was admitted to the bar in 1832.

Career
Ashe then moved to Tennessee and commenced practice in Brownsville. As of the 1840 census, he owned eight slaves.

He was elected as a Whig to the Twenty-eighth Congress from March 4, 1843 to March 3, 1845, where he voted in favor of the annexation of the slaveholding independent republic of Texas, but did not run for another term, saying he was in ill health  After leaving Congress, he moved to Galveston County, Texas, and settled near Galveston to resume his practice of law.

Death
Ashe continued the practice of his chosen profession until his death in Galveston on December 29, 1857 (age about 47 years). He is interred at a cemetery near Galveston.

References

External links
Ashe's Congressional biography

1810 births
1857 deaths
Tennessee lawyers
Texas lawyers
Ashe family
Whig Party members of the United States House of Representatives from Tennessee
People from Pender County, North Carolina
People from Galveston County, Texas
People from Brownsville, Tennessee
Trinity College (Connecticut) alumni
19th-century American politicians